Castlerigg Manor is a Catholic Residential Youth Centre - also often referred to as Catholic Youth Retreat Centres - in Keswick, Cumbria, in the north of England's Lake District National Park. It is owned and operated by the Catholic Diocese of Lancaster.

The purpose of Castlerigg Manor is to run residential retreats and courses for groups of Catholic young people.

History of Castlerigg 

It has been estimated that the building of Castlerigg Manor has existed since the late 1840s. It was originally a Manor House from which much of the land around it was owned and administered. It became a hotel in the 1920s. It was used briefly during the Second World War by the Army as a base for teaching soldiers driving in mountainous terrain.

In 1969, Monsignor Patrick O'Dea acquired the building on behalf of the Diocese of Lancaster together with the gate house which is now used as a holiday cottage.

Team
The youth work at Castlerigg Manor is led by a team of Catholics. , the director was Ruth Corless. From January 2005 until the summer of 2006, the centre director was part-time, sharing responsibilities with that of being parish priest to the town of Keswick. From August 2006, Peter Stanton became full-time residential director. The youth work is looked after by two full-time Team Leaders/Programme Co-ordinators. The other members of the youth team are gap year volunteers.

See also

Listed buildings in Keswick, Cumbria

External links
 Castlerigg Manor

Grade II listed buildings in Cumbria
Catholic Church in England
Catholic youth organizations
Keswick, Cumbria
Child-related organisations in the United Kingdom